David Mitchell Rosenthal (born March 23, 1969) is an American screenwriter, film director, and producer. He has directed the films A Single Shot, How It Ends, Janie Jones, and The Perfect Guy, among others.

Early life
Rosenthal was born in New York City, New York, the son of Dr. Mitchell S. Rosenthal, founder and Chairman of Phoenix House, and cookbook author Ellen Wright.

He was educated at Pomfret School in Connecticut and went on to graduate with a Bachelor of Arts from Colorado State University, a Master of Fine Arts in Poetry from Sarah Lawrence College and a Master of Fine Arts in Filmmaking from the American Film Institute.

Career

Early career
Rosenthal's career with film began with writing and photography at a young age. Growing up in New York City, he began shooting and studying photography in high school, and started writing soon after. He earned a Masters in poetry from Sarah Lawrence College and subsequently began publishing poetry in such literary magazines as The Paris Review. David's first book of poetry was published in 2000. In the same year he became a member of The Actors Studio playwrights unit with Mark Rydell.

Rosenthal's love of writing and film soon led him to the American Film Institute, where he received another Master's degree. A year after graduating, his first short film, Absence was bought and distributed to networks around the world including Canal+, HBO Latin America, PBS, Encore, and Starz.

His documentary feature, entitled Dylan's Run, which he produced and directed, followed the campaign trail of Dylan Glenn, who made history by becoming the first black republican to run for a congressional seat in the Deep South since Reconstruction.

Recent work

Rosenthal's first feature film, See This Movie, which he directed and co-wrote, premiered at the Aspen Comedy Festival. It was the first feature produced by Depth of Field, a production company operated by Chris Weitz and Paul Weitz (About a Boy, Antz, American Pie). See This Movie, which starred Seth Meyers and John Cho, won the Grand Jury Award for Best Narrative Feature at the Malibu Film Festival and was released in theaters in January 2006.

In 2008 Rosenthal directed the independent romantic comedy Falling Up, which was released by Anchor Bay and Starz in early 2010.

In October 2009 Rosenthal finished principal photography on his film Janie Jones. The film is inspired by his experience of meeting his daughter for the first time when she was eleven and he was thirty. Starring Abigail Breslin, Alessandro Nivola and Elisabeth Shue, the film follows the story of a down-on-his-luck indie rock star who 
meets his 13-year-old daughter who he never knew when her mother (Elisabeth Shue) drops her off en route to rehab.

The film premiered at the Toronto International Film Festival on September 17, 2010. It was also officially selected to the Tribeca Film Festival in 2011 and was released at the end of 2011.

A Single Shot, starring Sam Rockwell, William H. Macy and Jeffrey Wright had its world premiere at the Berlin International Film Festival or Berlinale in February 2013.

Rosenthal's remake of Jacob's Ladder for LD Entertainment is completed and was released in 2019.

How It Ends was released on July 13, 2018, by Netflix. The film is an action disaster thriller film written by Brooks McLaren. The film stars Theo James, Forest Whitaker, Grace Dove, Kat Graham, and Mark O'Brien.

Filmography
Feature films
See This Movie (2004)
Falling Up (2009)
Janie Jones (2010)
A Single Shot (2013)
The Perfect Guy (2015)
How It Ends (2018)
Jacob's Ladder (2019)
No Limit (2022)

References

External links

1969 births
AFI Conservatory alumni
Living people
Writers from New York City
Sarah Lawrence College alumni
Pomfret School alumni
Film directors from New York City